Virgin Express France S.A. was a French subsidiary of Virgin Express, with its head office on the grounds of Charles de Gaulle Airport in Tremblay-en-France.

History
The airline founded as Air Provence Charter in 1978, it flew Boeing 737 Classic aircraft. After EuroBelgian Airlines was renamed Virgin Express, Air Provence was renamed Virgin Express France in 1996.

See also
List of defunct airlines of France

References

External links

			 

Defunct airlines of France
Airlines established in 1978
Airlines established in 1996
Airlines disestablished in 1999